Elmore is a given name and surname of English origin. The name is identified as a habitational name derived from the place name, Elmore in Gloucestershire, named from Old English elm 'elm' + fer 'river bank' or ofer 'ridge'".

Given name
Elmore Elver (1877–1921), American politician
Elmore Harris (1855–1911), Canadian Baptist minister
Elmore W. Hurst (1851–1915), member of the Illinois House of Representatives
Elmore Hutchinson (born 1982), American cricketer
Elmore James (1918–1963), American blues singer, songwriter and musician
Elmore Keener (1935–1973), National Hockey League co-owner of the Pittsburgh Penguins
Elmore Leonard (1925–2013), American novelist
Elmore Morgenthaler (1922–1997), American basketball player
Elmore Nixon (1933–1975), American jump blues pianist and singer
Elmore Philpott (1896–1964), Canadian politician and journalist
Elmore Y. Sarles (1859–1929), ninth Governor of North Dakota
Elmore Smith (born 1949), American basketball player
Elmore Spencer (born 1969), American basketball player
Elmore Rual Torn (1931–2019), actor better known as Rip Torn

Surname
Albert Elmore (1904–1988), American college football coach
Albert Stanhope Elmore (1827–1909), 11th Secretary of State of Alabama
Alfred Elmore (1815–1881), British painter
Amanda Elmore (born 1991), American Olympic rower
Carolyn J. Elmore (born 1943), member of the Maryland House of Delegates
Charles Elmore (fl. 1990s–2010s), American scholar and jazz historian
Chris Elmore (born 1983), Welsh politician
D. Page Elmore (1939–2010), member of the Maryland House of Delegates
Doug Elmore (1939–2002), American football punter
Edward C. Elmore (c. 1826–c. 1926), Treasurer of the Confederate States of America
Elizabeth Elmore (born 1976), American singer-songwriter and lawyer
Ernest Elmore (1901–1957), English theater producer and crime/fantasy writer
Franklin H. Elmore (1799–1850), U.S. Senator from South Carolina
Gay Elmore (fl. 1980s–2020s), American college basketball player and lawyer
George Elmore (1880–1916), English footballer
Greg Elmore (born 1946), American drummer
Henry Elmore (born 1941), American Negro League baseball player
Henry M. Elmore (fl. 1850s–1860s), colonel in the Confederate States Army
Henton D. Elmore (1921–1991), American politician
Jake Elmore (born 1987), American baseball player
James H. Elmore (1843–1914), mayor of Green Bay, Wisconsin
Jeffrey Elmore (born 1978), member of the North Carolina House of Representatives
Joann Elmore (fl. 1970s–2020s), American physician
John Archer Elmore (1762–1834), American military officer and politician 
Jon Elmore (born 1996), American basketball player
Larry Elmore (born 1948), American fantasy artist, illustrator of Dungeons and Dragons
Len Elmore (born 1952), American college basketball analyst and former basketball player
Mable Elmore (born c. 1960s), Canadian politician
Malindi Elmore (born 1980), Canadian track and field athlete
Rick Elmore (fl. 1980s–2010s), judge of the North Carolina Court of Appeals
Ricky Elmore (born 1988), American football linebacker
Robert Elmore (1913–1985), American composer, organist, and pianist
Verdo Elmore (1899–1969), American baseball player
Walter Elmore (born 1857), U.S. Navy sailor and Medal of Honor recipient
William Augustus Elmore (1812–1890), lawyer and judge in New Orleans, Louisiana
William Cronk Elmore (1909–2003), American Manhattan Project physicist

See also
Guy Elmour (died 2012), New Caledonian professional football manager
Judge Elmore (disambiguation)
Elmore (disambiguation)

References

Surnames of English origin